The Austin and Northwestern Railroad began construction on a rail line west of Austin, Texas, USA, toward Llano on April 20, 1881. The railroad was originally built as a  narrow gauge line with plans to connect to the Texas and Pacific Railway at Abilene. Construction reached Burnet, Texas, by 1882 and the line was later extended to Granite Mountain by 1885 - when the railroad was contracted to haul pink granite for the new Texas State Capitol building in Austin. The company later extended its line  to Marble Falls by using the charter of the Granite Mountain and Marble Falls City Railroad. Due to a bend in the tracks, trains would occasionally derail, accidentally dumping some of the pink granite. The rocks which remain are a local point of interest. 

In 1901 the Texas legislature approved the merger of the Austin and Northwestern and the Houston and Texas Central Railroad. As a condition of the merger, a new passenger terminal was constructed at Austin, and the line was extended from Burnet to Lampasas in 1903. The Texas and New Orleans Railroad absorbed the line in 1934, and it was later absorbed into the Southern Pacific Company.

In 1986, Southern Pacific elected to abandon the entire  Giddings to Llano line. The City of Austin and Capital Metro purchased the railroad for $9.3 million, with the intent of using the right-of-way as a mass transit corridor. Capital Metro commenced commuter rail service vis-a-vis Capital MetroRail in 2010 on 32 miles of track, running from Leander, Texas to Austin.

The operating history of the Austin and Northwestern Railroad, subsequent to Capital Metro's acquisition of the railroad, is as follows:

 RailTex A&NW (AUNW): August 15, 1986 to May 6, 1996
 Longhorn Railroad (LHRR), operated by Central Tennessee: May 6, 1996 to April 2000 
 Austin Area Terminal Railroad (AUAR), operated by Trans-Global Solutions, Inc: April 2000 to October 1, 2007
 Austin Western Railroad (AWRR), operated by Watco: October 1, 2007 to present

In 1997 a 30mi stretch of the track running from Llano to the unincorporated community of Fairland, Texas was added to the National Register of Historic Places as the Austin and Northwestern Railroad Historic District-Fairland to Llano.

Cities named after A&NW officials 
 Cedar Park, Texas was previously named Bruggerhoff, after a A&NW railroad official
 Leander, Texas is named after a A&NW railroad official
 Bertram, Texas is named after the largest shareholder of the A&NW railroad
 Manor, Texas is named after someone who donated land to the H&TC railroad in the area now known as Manor
 Elgin, Texas is named after the H&TC's land commissioner
 Giddings, Texas is named after someone who was instrumental in bringing the H&TC railroad to Giddings

References

 

Defunct Texas railroads
Predecessors of the Southern Pacific Transportation Company
Railway companies established in 1881
Railway companies disestablished in 1901
Spin-offs of the Southern Pacific Transportation Company
Railway companies disestablished in 1996
Narrow gauge railroads in Texas
1986 disestablishments in Texas
3 ft gauge railways in the United States
1881 establishments in Texas